Paavo Eemil Virkkunen (27 September 1874 – 13 July 1959) was a Finnish conservative politician.

Virkkunen was born in Pudasjärvi. He was a member of the Finnish Party and was elected in the parliament in 1913, but joined the National Coalition Party in 1918. He was five times the Speaker of the Parliament. He became the chairman of the party in 1932 following the six-year leadership of Kyösti Haataja.

He died in Pälkäne, aged 84, and is buried in the Hietaniemi Cemetery in Helsinki.

References 

1874 births
1959 deaths
People from Pudasjärvi
People from Oulu Province (Grand Duchy of Finland)
20th-century Finnish Lutheran clergy
Finnish Party politicians
National Coalition Party politicians
Ministers of Education of Finland
Speakers of the Parliament of Finland
Members of the Parliament of Finland (1913–16)
Members of the Parliament of Finland (1916–17)
Members of the Parliament of Finland (1917–19)
Members of the Parliament of Finland (1919–22)
Members of the Parliament of Finland (1922–24)
Members of the Parliament of Finland (1924–27)
Members of the Parliament of Finland (1927–29)
Members of the Parliament of Finland (1929–30)
Members of the Parliament of Finland (1930–33)
Members of the Parliament of Finland (1933–36)
Members of the Parliament of Finland (1939–45)
People of the Finnish Civil War (White side)
Finnish people of World War II
University of Helsinki alumni
Burials at Hietaniemi Cemetery